The cranial nerve exam is a type of neurological examination. It is used to identify problems with the cranial nerves by physical examination. It has nine components. Each test is designed to assess the status of one or more of the twelve cranial nerves (I-XII). These components correspond to testing the sense of smell (I), visual fields and acuity (II), eye movements (III, IV, VI) and pupils (III, sympathetic and parasympathetic), sensory function of face (V), strength of facial (VII) and shoulder girdle muscles (XI), hearing (VII, VIII), taste (VII, IX, X), pharyngeal movement and reflex (IX, X), tongue movements (XII).

Components

See also
 Cranial nerves
 Cranial nerve nucleus

References

External links
 NeurologyExam.com Free neurology exam videos by Cleveland Clinic trained neurologist.

Neurology procedures
Physical examination